Royal Air Force Newchurch or RAF Newchurch was a temporary Second World War airfield at Newchurch, Kent. It was a base for a  Hawker Tempest wing that gave fighter cover over occupied France in the period up to and beyond D-Day and later defended south-east England against attack from V-1 flying bombs.

History
Newchurch was one of a number of Advanced Landing Grounds (ALG) built in Kent during 1943. From July 1943 it became the base for three Supermarine Spitfire and one Hawker Hurricane squadrons. In October 1943 the squadrons moved to RAF Detling while the airfield was improved.

In April 1944 it became the base of 150 Wing comprising three squadrons of Hawker Tempests. Commanded by Wing Commander Roland Beamont the Newchurch Tempest Wing provided air cover for the Normandy landings it was then tasked with defending against attacks by V-1 flying bombs. The Wing destroyed 638 V-1s before leaving Newchurch to support the advance through Belgium and the Netherland. No longer needed in December 1944 the airfield was restored to farmland.

Royal Air Force units and aircraft

The following units were also here at some point:
 No. 125 Airfield
 No. 150 Airfield
 No. 2749 Squadron RAF Regiment
 No. 2800 Squadron RAF Regiment

References

Citations

Bibliography

External links
 The Advanced Landing Ground at Newchurch

Royal Air Force stations in Kent
Royal Air Force stations of World War II in the United Kingdom